The discography of American record producer, TM88. It includes a list of songs produced, co-produced and remixed by year, artists, album and title.

2012

Waka Flocka Flame - Triple F Life: Friends, Fans & Family
 10. "Lurkin (feat. Plies)

DJ Drama - Quality Street Music
08. "I'ma Hata (feat Waka Flocka Flame and Tyler, The Creator and D-Bo)

2013

Fredo Santana - Fredo Krueger
 05. "Rollie On My Wrist"

Gucci Mane - Trap God 2
 10. "Squad Car (feat. Big Bank Black & OG Boo Dirty)"

Gucci Mane - Trap House III
 01. "Traphouse 3 (feat. Rick Ross)" (Produced with Southside)
 10. "Darker (feat. Chief Keef)" (Produced with Southside)
Hlsjlodja

Gucci Mane & 808 Mafia - World War 3: Gas
 01. "One Minute"
 04. "Geekin (feat. Waka Flocka Flame)"
 08. "Match Maker"
 13. "Rather Be (feat. Keyshia Dior)"

Gucci Mane & Metro Boomin - World War 3: Molly
 09. "Don't Look At Me (feat. Young Thug)"
 14. "You A Drug"

Gucci Mane - The State vs. Radric Davis II: The Caged Bird Sings
 07. "Bad Bitch" (Produced with Southside)
 10. "Wish You Was Me" (Produced with Bankroll Clay)

Future & Free Bands Gang - Future Presents: F.B.G. The Movie
 05. "Mark McGwire"
 03. "Ceelo (feat. Wale)" (Produced with Southside)
 09. "Chosen One (feat. Rocko)"
 12. "DNA"
 15. "Keep On Shining (feat. Casino)"
 19. "You Wonder (feat. Busta Rhymes & Rocko)"
17. "Finessin" (Produced with Southside)

DJ Esco - Black Woodstock Soundtrack
 06. "Take This 4 Granted" (feat. Future)

DJ Esco - No Sleep
 03. "Day One (feat. Future & Yo Gotti)" (Produced with Metro Boomin)
 07. "Club On Smash (feat. Future)"

Chief Keef - Where He Get it (Single)
 "Where He Get it" (Produced with Metro Boomin, Southside & Sonny Digital)

Casino - Ex Drug Dealer
 05. "Done It All (feat. Young Scooter &  Marco)"
 14. "Keep On Shinin (feat. Future)" (Produced with Southside)

Ace Hood - Trials & Tribulations
 10. "Pray for Me" (Produced with Metro Boomin, Sonny Digital & Southside)

2014

Bankroll Fresh - Life of a Hot Boy
 17. "Come Wit It"

Tracy T - The Wolf of all Streets
 02. "On Me (feat. Meek Mill)"
 03. "No Reason (feat. Que)"
 09. "Champagne"

iLoveMakonnen - I Love Makonnen EP
 07. "Exclusive" (produced with Metro Boomin & Southside)

Future - Monster
 07. "After That (feat. Lil Wayne)" (Produced with Southside)
 11. "Fetti" (Produced with Metro Boomin & Southside)
 14. "Showed Up" (Produced with DJ Spinz)
 16. "Codeine Crazy"

Young Thug & Bloody Jay - Black Portland
 04. "No Fucks" (Produced with Southside)

Young Thug - Diary of a Stoner

 10. "Every Morning (feat. Skooly)"
 12. "Eww" (Produced with Southside)

Young Thug - Ready for War
 10. "Cash Talk" (Produced with Metro Boomin)

Wiz Khalifa - 28 Grams
 03. "Let'R" (Produced with Metro Boomin & Southisde)
 22. "How To Be Real (feat. Curtis Williams)" (Produced with Southside)

Travis Porter - Music Money Magnums
 06. "No Understanding"

Rocko - Ignant
 03. "Get The Fuck Outta Here"
 06. "Disrespectful" (Produced with MP808)
 13. "LUV" (Produced with Smurf)

Rocko - Expect The Unexpected
 07. "Good (feat. Lil Wayne)" (Produced with MP808)

Rocko - Poet
 04. "Phenomenal Woman" (Produced with Smurf)

Rocko - FOOD
 08. "B.A.N.A.N.A.S." (Produced with MP808 and Tazzaracci)

Que - Jungle Fever (Single)
 01. "Jungle Fever"

Que & Mike Fresh - Que Fresco
 04. "Yes Men"

Migos - Rich Nigga Timeline
 07. "Pop That"

Migos - Trouble (Single)
 "Trouble (feat. T.I.)" (Produced with MP808)

Hoodrich Pablo Juan - Designer Drugz
 03. "Trap Dab (feat. Migos, Jose Guapo & Peewee Longway)"

LL Cool J - Break Your Face
 01. "Break Your Face" (Produced with Southside)

K Camp - In Due Time
 04. "Oh No"

Young Thug - Boy (How To Be Real)
 01. "Boy (How To Be Real) (feat. Wiz Khalifa)" (Produced with Southside)

Gucci Mane - East Atlanta Santa
 06. "Maybe it's the Juice"
 11. "One Min (feat. Migos)" (Produced with Southside)

Future - Honest
 10. "Special (feat. Young Scooter)" (Produced with Southside)

Doe B - D.O.A.T. 3
 16. "Da Truth" (Produced with M16)

Cash Out - Juice (Remix) (Single)
 "Juice (Remix) (feat. Lil Durk)" (Produced with Southside)

Shad Da God - Xans (Single)
 01. "Xans"

Chaz Gotti - Wait'n
 04. "Porsche"
 07. "Jeweler (feat. Cash Out)" (Produced with Southside)

2015

French Montana - Casino Life 2
 03. "Moses (Feat. Chris Brown & Migos)" (Produced with Southside, DJ Spinz & K Major)
 07. "5 Mo (Feat. Travi$ Scott & Lil Durk (Produced with MP808)
 12. "All Hustle No Work (Feat. will.i.am & Lil Durk)" (Produced with Southside)

Young Dolph - High Class Street Music 5
 01. "3 Way"
 18. "The Plug Best Friend"

Sy Ari Da Kid - Street Damage
 04. "Watching (by Sierra Leone, featuring Sy Ari Da Kid)"

Tracy T - 50 Shades of Green
 03. "Shoot Em Up"

Wiz Khalifa 
 "Decisions"

21 Savage - The Slaughter Tape
 06. "Drip" (Produced with Metro Boomin)

Juicy J - 100% Juice
 08. "Tap Back"
 10. "Details" (Produced with Lex Luger
 12. "Film (Remix) (feat. Future, Boosie Badazz & G.O.D.)" (Produced with Felli Fel & Young Chop)

Juicy J - O's to Oscars
 05. "Yeah Nigga"
 08. "Up (feat. Wiz Khalifa & Project Pat)"
 09. "Beef"
 14. "You And I (feat. Ty Dolla $ign)" (Produced with Southside and MP808)

Gucci Mane - King Gucci
 10. "I'm Too Much (feat. Riff Raff)"

Gucci Mane - Dinner
 03. "Angry (feat. Lil Reese & Fredo Santana)"
07. "Play with your Children" (feat. Fredo Santana (Produced with Southside)

Gucci Mane - Trapology
 03. "Young Niggas (feat. Jadakiss & Fetty Wap)"

Travis Scott - Rodeo
 07. "Nightcrawler (feat. Swae Lee of Rae Sremmurd & Chief Keef" (Produced with Metro Boomin, Southside, Mike Dean and Allen Ritter)

DJ Outta Space - Thug Ciity - Single
 Thug Ciity (feat. Young Sizzle, TM88, NephewTexasBoy, Spiiker, Ethan Sacii, and Spihug City)

Travis Scott
 "Nothing but Net (feat. Young Thug & PartyNextDoor)" (Produced with Southside, Boi-1da & Frank Dukes)

DJ Outta Space - Thug Ciity (Remix) - Single
 Thug Ciity (Remix) (feat. 2 Chainz, K Camp & Quavo)

Drake - If You're Reading This It's Too Late
 14. "Company (feat. Travis Scott)" (Produced with Southside, WondaGurl, Travis Scott & Allen Ritter)

2 Chainz - Trap-A-Velli 3
 10. "Big Meech Era"

Young Jeezy - Church in These Streets
 08. "God" (Produced with Southside)

PartyNextDoor
 "Party At 8"

Wiz Khalifa - Cabin Fever 3
 01. "Respect (feat. K Camp & Juicy J)"
 05. "Shit Starters (feat. 2 Chainz)

Team Eastside Snoop
 "Chicken Up"

Waka Flocka Flame - Flockaveli 1.5
 01. "Shootin" (Produced with Southside)
 02. "Short Handed (feat. Chaz Gotti)" (Produced with Southside)
 09. "Feel About Me" (Produced with Southside"

Reese (rapper) - Jump Off a Building
 01. "Yesterday"
 02. "Lobby Party (feat. Rich Homie Quan)"
 03. "Old Skool (feat. Kari Faux)"
 05. "Freestyle"

SluggMania - Nintendo 88
 01. "Revo"
 02. "Cartridge"
 03. "Addies"
 04. "My Brother & Me"
 05. "Nintendo"

KEY! - Screaming Dreams: The Prelude
 02. "50 Round Drums (feat. 21 Savage)" (Produced with Metro Boomin & Sonny Digital)

Peewee Longway - Money, Pounds & Ammunition 2
 05. "Catch Up (feat. Muddgod)"

Young Thug - Slime Season 2
 16. "Oh Lord" (Produced with Ricky Racks)

Lil Uzi Vert - Luv Is Rage
09. "Queso" (feat. Wiz Khalifa) (Produced with Wheezy)

2016

Project Pat - Street God 2
 04. "Catching Juggs"

Zach Farlow - The Great Escape 2
 12. "Truth" (Produced with London on da Track)

Icewear Vezzo - Moonwalken
 02. "MoonWalken"
 05. "Pints & You"

Juicy J - Lit in Ceylon
 02. "Mansion"
 03. "Blue Bently"
 04. "ACT" (Produced with Smash David)
 06. "Back Out"
 08. "Green Carpet"
 13. "Ol Skool"

Juicy J, Wiz Khalifa & TM88 - TGOD Mafia: Rude Awakening
 01. "TGOD Mafia intro"
 02. "Da Power"
 03. "Medication" 
 04. "Where Was You"
 05. " All Night"
 06. "I See It I Want It" (produced with Cubeatz)
 07. "Hit Me Up"
 08. "Green Suicide"
 09. "Bossed Up" (produced with Cubeatz)
 10. "She In Love" (produced with Cubeatz)
 11. "Breaking News (Feat. Project Pat)
 12. "Itself"
 13. "Luxury Flow"
 14. "Stay The Same" (produced with Cubeatz)
 15. "On The Way"
 16. "Cell Ready" (produced with Cubeatz)

Wiz Khalifa - Khalifa
06. "Bake Sale (feat. Travis Scott)" (Produced with Juicy J, Lex Luger, DJ Spinz & Crazy Mike)

Wiz Khalifa - Rolling Papers 2
 "Pull Up (feat. Lil Uzi Vert)" (Produced with Ricky P)

Peewee Longway - Mr. Blue Benjamin
 14. "Jackie Tan (feat. Juicy J & Wiz Khalifa)" (Produced with Deedotwill)

Fredo Santana - Fredo Mafia
 07. "Mafia Talk" (Produced with Metro Boomin)

Ethan Sacii - Dirty Glove Bastard 3
 13. "No Date (feat. Tabius Tate)"
  16. "LA"

Future - Evol
 07. "Seven Rings" (Produced with MP808)

HLVDNI
 Kizo ima Manjaču (produced with Gezin)

Shad Da God - Free the Goat
 01. "Wut I Luv"

T Shyne - Trip Trap EP
 "Andre 3K"

Team Eastside Snoop
 "I Be Tripping"

YFN Lucci - Wish Me Well 2
 02. "YFN"
 04. "Woke Up Boss"

2 Chainz - Felt Like Cappin and ColleGrove
 04. "Not Invited" [Felt Like Cappin]
 07. "Not Invited" (produced with Reignman Rich) [ColleGrove]

2 Chainz - Daniel Son; Necklace Don
 02. "Get Out The Bed"

Young Thug - Jeffery
 01. "Wyclef Jean" (Produced with Supah Mario)
 02. "Floyd Mayweather (feat. Travis Scott, Gucci Mane & Gunna)" (Produced with Wheezy, Billboard Hitmakers & Goose)
 04. "Future Swag"
 06. "Guwop (feat. Quavo, Offset & Young Scooter)" (Produced with Wheezy & Cassius Jay)

Travis Scott - Birds in the Trap Sing McKnight
 03. "coordinate" (Produced with Cubeatz)

Juicy J - Rubba Band Business: The Album
 "No English (feat. Travis Scott)" (Produced with Lex Luger)
 "Ballin (feat. Kanye West)" (Produced with Cubeatz)

Travis Scott
 "RaRa (feat. Lil Uzi Vert)" (produced with Cubeatz)

TM88 - Been Thru a Lot - Single
 "Been Thru a Lot (feat. Young Thug and Lil Yachty)" (Produced with Supah Mario)

Juicy J - #MUSTBENICE
01. "Trap (featuring Gucci Mane and Peewee Longway)" (Produced with Lex Luger)
04. "Feeling Like Obama"
05. "Lotto" (produced with Cubeatz)
06. "Whatcha Gone Do" (produced with Cubeatz)
08. "I Wonder"
09. "Lou Will"
11. "Super Fire"
12. "Panties (featuring Jeremih)" (produced with Cubeatz)
13. "What I Call It"
15. "Outro"

Taylor Gang - TGOD Vol. 1
04. "Come Through"

Gucci Mane - Woptober
02. "Aggressive" (Produced with Zaytoven)

Gucci Mane - The Return of East Atlanta Santa
07. "Crash"

Trinidad James - The Wake Up 2
01. "Taylor Swift" (Feat. ILoveMakonnen & Peewee Longway)

2017

Rich Gang - Single
00. "Bit Bak" (featuring Young Thug and Birdman)

Lil Donald - Still Here
06. "88"

Lil Uzi Vert - Luv is Rage 1.5
03. "XO TOUR Llif3"

Lil Baby - Perfect Timing
06. "100 Round" (featuring Lil Yachty)

Nessly -Wildflower
00. "Falling Down"
03. "Who Has It"

Big Boi - Boomiverse
04. "In The South" (featuring Gucci Mane and Pimp C)

YKOM - Year of the Young
08. "Flex"

Smokepurpp - Deadstar
12. "Hold It"

Smokepurpp
 Glock in My Benz

Lil Uzi Vert - Luv Is Rage 2
 16. "XO TOUR Llif3"
18. "Loaded"

Future & Young Thug - Super Slimey
13. "Group Home"

Juicy J - Gas Face
 "One Of Them"

Lil Yachty & Nessly
 "Guacamole"

Roscoe Dash
 Ye's

Blac Youngsta
 Vent

Gucci Mane - Mr. Davis
 Enormous (featuring Ty Dolla Sign) 
 Money Piling

Lil Pump - Lil Pump
09. Foreign

Lil Duke - Life In The Hills
09. Diamonds Dancing  (featuring Young Thug) [Produced with  Wheezy]

Gunna - Drip Season 2
08. Make No Sense  (featuring Lil Duke)

Moneybagg Yo - Heartless
02. Question

Moneybaggyo - Federal 3X
07. "Forreal"

Travis Scott & Quavo - Huncho Jack, Jack Huncho
04. "Motorcycle Patches"

Shy Glizzy - Quiet Storm
18. "Take Me Away"

24Hrs - ILUVTPC V1
09. "Bentley Coup" (featuring Smooky Margielaa)

Larry June
 "Off the Dribble" (Single)

2018

Lil Uzi Vert
"Mood"

Ken Carson
"Dream"

Kidd Kidd - Unquestionable
5. "Count on My Hand"

Wiz Khalifa
"Best Life" (Single)

24hrs
"Loose Change" (Single) (with Jose Guapo)

G Herbo - Humble Beast (deluxe edition)
22. "No Depression"

Mexico Rann - Penguin Skin 2
3. "By Myself" (featuring Young Thug)

Dyscaine - 80HD
7. "Don't Care"

DJ Bandz - ChiLanta 4
11. "I.C.W.N.T. (Freestyle)" (Future)

Nessly - Wildflower
2. "Ungrateful" 
3. "WhoHasIt" (featuring Ski Mask the Slump God) 
8. "Not My Lover" (featuring Hoodrich Pablo Juan) 
9. "Bunjee Jump! (Interlude)" 
10. "Downers" 
11. "Sorry Not Sorry"

Lil Trogan - Eazy
03. "Black Panther Freestyle"

Big Baby Scumbag
"Hammer Time" (Single)

Lil Yachty - Lil Boat 2
09. "Das Cap"

Jose Guapo - Lingo 2: The Return
06. "Cash Pronto" (featuring Offset)
10. "I Might Have Too" (featuring Derez De'Shon)
13. "Actin Up"

XXXTentacion - ?
09. "Going Down!"

Trouble - Edgewood
06. "Wuzzam, Wuzzup"

Cash Money Records - Before Anythang (soundtrack)
03. "Back Bone" (Young Thug) 
11. "4Real" (Gucci Mane)

Lil Durk - Just Cause Y'all Waited
03. "When I Was Little"

Ufo361 - 808
09. "Dream" (featuring Trettman)

YoungBoy Never Broke Again - Until Death Call My Name
12. "Public Figure"

Te$o - Shizos
05. "Wenn das Telefon klingelt"

Rae Sremmurd - SR3MM
08. "Rock N Roll Hall of Fame"

24hrs
"All I Know" (Single)

G Herbo and Southside - Swervo
02. "Swervo" 
07. "Pac n Dre" 
08. "Bonjour"

MadeinTYO
"Switch It Up" (Single)

Wiz Khalifa - Rolling Papers 2
01. "Hot Now" 
04. "Very Special" 
05. "Goin Hard"
06. "Holyfield"

Travis Scott - Astroworld 
"No Bystanders"

2020

Lil Uzi Vert - Eternal Atake
P2

Roy Woods and Wiz Khalifa - solo hit
So High

Moneybagg Yo - Time Served (Deluxe)
Blue Jean Bandit

2022

Future - I Never Liked You 

 1. "712pm" (produced with Moon, MoXart Beatz, Wheezy)
 5. "Puffin on Zootiez" (produced with Nils, TooDope)
 14. "The Way Things Going" (produced with Daan)

References

Production discographies
Hip hop discographies
Discographies of American artists